Uteriporidae is a sub family of Maricola triclads.

Genera 
List of known genera:<ref>*Tyler S, Schilling S, Hooge M, and Bush LF (comp.) (2006-2012) Turbellarian taxonomic database. Version 1.7  Database </ref>Ectoplana Miroplana Nesion Obrimoposthia OstenoculaPaucumaraProcerodellaSluysiaTryssosoma''

References

External links 

Maricola